Hokkaido Obihiro Hakuyou High School (北海道帯広柏葉高等学校, Hokkaidō Obihiro Hakuyō Kōtō Gakkō) is a high school in Obihiro, Hokkaido, Japan, founded in 1923. Hokkaido Kushiro High School is one of high schools administrated by Hokkaido.

The school is operated by the Hokkaido Prefectural Board of Education.

Notable alumni
Miyuki Nakajima (中島 みゆき) Singer-Songwriter and Radio Personality 
Miwa Yoshida (吉田 美和) Musician, and The Lead Singer for The Band Dreams Come True
Kazuyoshi Kumakiri (熊切 和嘉) Film Director
Hiromu Arakawa (荒川 弘) Manga artist and writer, best known for the series Fullmetal Alchemist

Address
 Address: Higashi-5jyo-Minami-1choume-1banchi, Obihiro, Hokkaido, Japan

External links
Official Website of Hokkaido Obihiro Hakuyou High School

High schools in Hokkaido
Educational institutions established in 1923
1923 establishments in Japan